Moustafa Allozy (born 17 June 1963) is an Egyptian weightlifter. He competed in the men's middleweight event at the 1992 Summer Olympics.

References

External links

1963 births
Living people
Egyptian male weightlifters
Olympic weightlifters of Egypt
Weightlifters at the 1992 Summer Olympics
Place of birth missing (living people)